Sophisticated Lady is an LP album by Julie London, released by Liberty Records under catalog number LRP-3203 as a monophonic recording and catalog number LST-7203 in stereo in 1962.

Track listing
 "Sophisticated Lady" - (Duke Ellington, Mitchell Parish, Irving Mills) - 2:37
 "Blame It On My Youth" - (Oscar Levant, Edward Heyman) - 2:35
 "Make It Another Old-Fashioned, Please" - (Cole Porter) - 2:32
 "You're Blasé" - (Ord Hamilton, Bruce Siever) - 3:13
 "Bewitched" - (Richard Rodgers, Lorenz Hart) - 2:55
 "Spring Can Really Hang You Up the Most" - (Tommy Wolf, Fran Landesman) - 3:50
 "Remind Me" - (Jerome Kern, Dorothy Fields) - 3:14
 "When She Makes Music" - (Jack Segal, Marvin Fisher) - 2:43
 "When the World Was Young" - (M. Philippe-Gérard, Johnny Mercer) - 4:43
 "If I Should Lose You" - (Ralph Rainger, Leo Robin) - 2:50
 "Where Am I to Go?" - (Bobby Troup, Matt Dennis) - 2:55
 "Absent Minded Me" - (Jule Styne, Bob Merrill) - 2:23

References

Liberty Records albums
Julie London albums
1962 albums